The Battle of Placilla was an engagement fought during the Chilean Civil War of 1891 between Balmacedist and Congressional forces on 28 August 1891. The Congressist victory in the battle essentially decided the fate of the war. Congressist troops entered Santiago on 30 August. President José Manuel Balmaceda committed suicide inside the Argentine embassy in Santiago on 19 September.

Gallery

References

Conflicts in 1891
1891 in Chile
Battles involving Chile
August 1891 events
History of Valparaíso Region
Placilla